Coleophora bulganella is a moth of the family Coleophoridae. It is found in Mongolia.

The larvae feed on Caragana bungei. They feed on the leaves of their host plant.

References

bulganella
Moths described in 1974
Moths of Asia